Pedro Santana y Familias, 1st Marquess of Las Carreras (June 29, 1801June 14, 1864) was a Dominican military commander and royalist politician who served as the president of the junta that had established the First Dominican Republic, a precursor to the position of the President of the Dominican Republic, and as the first President of the republic in the modern line of succession. A traditional royalist who was fond of the Monarchy of Spain and the Spanish Empire, he ruled as a governor-general, but effectively as an authoritarian dictator. During his life he enjoyed the title of "Libertador de la Patria."

Santana was a lifelong supporter of the Dominican revolt against the Haitian occupation and a noted general during the Dominican War of Independence (1844–1856). Unlike many of his political opponents who wanted to ultimately establish an independent Dominican state, Santana sought to reintegrate Hispaniola into the Spanish Empire. He oversaw the reestablishment of the Captaincy General of Santo Domingo as well as exile and imprisonment of a number of noted separatist and nationalist dissidents who had previously been his comrades during the war of independence. Under mounting pressure from the opposition which had been organizing a coup d'etat, he was forced to resign from his position. He died during the Dominican Restoration War, after which the country regained its independence.

Background 
Pedro Santana was born in the northern border region of the colony of Santo Domingo (now called the Dominican Republic), in the city of Hincha (today Hinche, now located in Haiti), on June 29, 1801. His mother was Petronila Familias, a Dominican of Spanish Canarian descent, and his father was Pedro Santana, who according most sources was of Canarian ancestry too although one source states that he was a Mexican of indigenous origin. Both of his parents were landowners in the border zone between the Spanish territory of Santo Domingo and the French territory Saint Domingue. 

Due to the Haitian revolution and slave revolts of 1804, the Santana family moved to the Cibao valley, specifically in Gurabo, before fleeing to El Seibo (in the eastern part of the country) amid the massacre of whites in the island. The family dedicated themselves to cattle ranching. In that region his father cut off the head of French governor Jean-Louis Ferrand during the battle of Palo Hincado, and took it as a trophy to the city of Santo Domingo.

Military and political role 

Santana was the Dominican Republic's president (although he ruled as a dictator) during the years 1844–48, 1853–56, and 1858–61 (when Spain annexed the Dominican Republic as Santana wished). Thereafter, Santana became governor, with the rank of Captain General of the territory. He held those titles until 1862.

Santana had great talent as a military leader, but was unable to leave his dictatorial personality on the battlefield.  Though many historians criticise his rule as an economic disaster, Santana was meticulous in conducting public affairs, and obviously a great soldier.

Santana also fought with distinction in the Revolution of July 7, 1857, when Cibao placed their revolutionary army under his command. The Congress of the Dominican Republic awarded Santana the title of “Liberator of the Nation” on July 18, 1849 for his victory in the Battle of Las Carreras, where a force of 800 Dominican troops, led by Santana, defeated 10,000 troops of the Haitian Army led by Faustin Soulouque.

As a dictator 

He is considered a brilliant military strategist, and was a key figure in the successful separation of the Dominican Republic from Haiti. But many historians, such as Nancie L. González and Howard J. Wiarda, think that some of his later actions barred him from becoming a genuine national hero.

 After he drove the Haitian army out of the country in the Dominican War of Independence, he almost immediately moved to eliminate the very Independentists that fought alongside him. Santana felt that the new nation could not survive without being annexed to Spain, which the Trinitarian Independentists did not accept.

 He relentlessly arrested or exiled members of La Trinitaria. The very first person that was forced out of the country was Juan Pablo Duarte, founding father of the new Dominican Republic. He  died nobly in Caracas.

 After the campaign of 1849, conflict between Pedro Santana and legendary French-Dominican war hero, General Antonio Duvergé increased. Duvergé was accused of conspiracy against the government of Santana and was executed with his twenty-three year old son, Alcides Duvergé on April 11, 1855. Duvergé was one of the most prominent leaders of the Dominican military, his execution caused ripples around the Dominican community.  

 Santana attacked María Trinidad Sánchez, the first heroine of the Republic and aunt of Francisco del Rosario Sánchez of the Founding Fathers of the nation. She and Concepción Bona made the first national flag.  Santana imprisoned her, tortured her, and sentenced her to death when she refused to name "conspirators" against him in the newly independent republic. Exactly one year after the proclamation of Independence (February 27, 1845) María Trinidad Sánchez was executed by a firing squad. This made her the first (but not last) female martyr of the republic.

Family and marriages

Santana had two brothers, Ramón (b. 29 June 1801) —his twin brother— and Florencio (b. 14 November 1805) —who was paralytic, mute and mentally ill.

Pedro Santana was engaged to María del Carmen Ruiz, a local beauty, who was thrown from her horse, dying instantly, when her horse shied as she was returning to El Seybo from a pilgrimage to the sanctuary of Our Lady of Altagracia in Higüey. The death of his fiancée sent Santana into a deep depression. His twin brother Ramón, convinced Pedro to accompany him on a visit to his fiancée Froilana Febles, who lived in El Seybo. During his visits to his soon to-be sister-in-law, Pedro fell in love with his brother's future mother-in-law, the much older Micaela Antonia del Rivero, widow of the very wealthy Miguel Febles.  This meant that Froilana Febles became Pedro Santana's sister-in-law and stepdaughter at the same time, while Micaela del Rivero became sister-in-law and mother-in-law of Ramón Santana. The Santana-del Rivero marriage was very unhappy, but it gave Pedro Santana influence and power in the Southeastern region.

His brother Ramón died on 15 June 1844 during the Revolutionary war of Independence.

After the death of his first wife (his wife died on 12 December 1854), Pedro Santana remarried, this time to Ana Zorrilla, another older, wealthy widow.  Because of his marriages to older women, he had no legitimate children.

Collateral descendants
Via Ramón Santana's marriage to Froilana Febles, Pedro Santana had 3 nephews: Manuel (b. 24 March 1833), Francisco, and Rafael Santana (b. 1834-5), and a niece, María de Los Ángeles Santana (b. 1844), whom inherited many of Santana's properties. Among Rafael Santana and his wife Paula Bobadilla’s  descendants are Cardinal Octavio Beras and comedian Freddy Beras-Goico.
Descendants of his niece, María de los Ángeles Santana Febles, and her husband Isidoro Durán include Minister and former senator José Ignacio Paliza, diplomat Patricia Villegas, and congressman Orlando Jorge Villegas.

Last years

Pedro Santana died in the city of Santo Domingo on June 14, 1864, shortly after having been bestowed the hereditary title of Marqués de las Carreras (28 March 1862), in recognition of his victory in the Battle of Las Carreras, by Queen Isabella II of Spain, and was buried in the Ozama Fortress next to the Torre del Homenaje. Since 1978, his remains have lain at the National Pantheon of the Dominican Republic.

Santana died childless. He bequeathed his properties to his nephews, his godchildren, and his stepchildren. He included a pension to his disabled brother Florencio and his aunt Dominga Familia.

References

External links

Dominican Republic Heads of State
Pedro Santana Familias (in Spanish) by Miosotis de Jesus
Pedro Santana at Find A Grave

|-

|-

|-

1801 births
1864 deaths
People from Hinche
People of the Dominican War of Independence
Dominican Republic people of Canarian descent
Dominican Republic people of Spanish descent
Dominican Republic people of indigenous peoples descent
Dominican Republic people of Mexican descent
Presidents of the Dominican Republic
Dominican Republic military personnel
Genocide survivors
Marquesses of Spain
Nobility of the Americas
Spanish monarchists
Spanish nobility
Dominican Republic twins
Dominican Republic independence activists
Mixed-race Dominicans